Neurotic Outsiders was a British-American rock supergroup founded in 1995, consisting of Steve Jones of the Sex Pistols, Matt Sorum and Duff McKagan of Guns N' Roses, and John Taylor of Duran Duran. The first line-up featured Billy Idol and Steve Stevens (together with McKagan and Sorum) but they were soon replaced by Jones and Taylor.

Originally a gathering of friends jamming together at the Viper Room in Los Angeles, they eventually released one eponymous album on Maverick Records in September 1996, and briefly toured Europe and North America. The album was followed up by the Angelina 5-song EP in 1997, which was a Japanese-only release.

The band was originally named Neurotic Boy Outsiders after an article in The Guardian Taylor had read in the 70s. The "Boy" was dropped at the request of Sorum and McKagan.

They reunited briefly in April 1999 for three shows at the Viper Room.

This was not the first time that Guns N' Roses members and Steve Jones had collaborated. Axl Rose from Guns N' Roses, and Ian Astbury, Billy Duffy, and Mickey Curry, all from The Cult - which Matt Sorum played with both before and after Guns N' Roses - all also made guest appearances on the Steve Jones solo album Fire and Gasoline.

This would also mark the first of two collaborations between Steve Jones and John Taylor. The second collaboration was on Duran Duran's 2015 album Paper Gods.

Former members
Last lineup
 Duff McKagan – guitar, bass, lead and backing vocals
 Matt Sorum – drums, backing vocals
 Steve Jones – guitar, lead vocals
 John Taylor – bass, lead and backing vocals

Previous members
 Billy Idol – lead vocals (1995)
 Steve Stevens – guitar (1995)

Discography

Track listing for album
All tracks composed by Steve Jones except where indicated
 "Nasty Ho" – 4:32 (lead vocals: Steve Jones)
 "Always Wrong" (John Taylor) – 3:25 (lead vocals: John Taylor)
 "Angelina" – 2:55 (lead vocals: Steve Jones)
 "Good News" – 3:32 (lead vocals: Duff McKagan)
 "Better Way" (Steve Jones, John Taylor) – 4:22 (lead vocals: Steve Jones & John Taylor)
 "Feelings Are Good" (John Taylor) – 3:23 (lead vocals: John Taylor)
 "Revolution" – 3:48 (lead vocals: Duff McKagan)
 "Jerk" – 4:10 (lead vocals: Steve Jones)
 "Union" – 4:29 (lead vocals: Steve Jones)
 "Janie Jones" (Joe Strummer, Mick Jones) – 1:53 (lead vocals: Steve Jones & Duff McKagan)
 "Story of My Life" – 4:10 (lead vocals: Steve Jones)
 "Six Feet Under" (Steve Jones, Duff McKagan) – 4:00 (lead vocals: Duff McKagan)

Non-album B-sides

References

External links
 Neurotic Outsiders fansite

Duran Duran
Guns N' Roses
Sex Pistols
Rock music supergroups
Musical groups established in 1995